William Charlton or Chorlton (by 1517–1567) was an English politician.

He was a Member (MP) of the Parliament of England for Shropshire in April 1554.

References

1567 deaths
English MPs 1554
Year of birth uncertain